Bussière-Badil is a commune in the Dordogne department in southwestern France, part of the Parc naturel régional Périgord Limousin.

The place is first mentioned in 768 when the Order of Saint Benedict built a priory there. The Romanesque art-style church was built in the 12th century.

Population

See also
 Communes of the Dordogne department
 Parc naturel régional Périgord Limousin

References

Bussierebadil